Santander railway station, also known as Santander ADIF to distinguish it from the Santander Feve station, is the main railway station of the Spanish city of Santander, Cantabria. It opened in 1858 and served over 3 million passengers in 2018. The station is actually a complex of two stations, one serving Renfe Iberian-gauge railways, and another adjacent serving FEVE metre-gauge services to Bilbao-Abando and Oviedo.

Services

ADIF
Alvia services use the Madrid–León high-speed rail line as far as Palencia, and switches to the conventional rail network to serve Santander, and one Media Distancia service operates on the classic line between Santander and Valladolid-Campo Grande. The Cercanías Santander commuter rail line also begins at the station.
{{Adjacent stations|noclear=y
|system1=Renfe
|line1=Alvia|left1=Torrelavega|to-left1=Madrid Chamartín|to-right1=Gijón
|line2=Alvia|left2=Torrelavega|to-left2=Alicante|to-right2=Gijón
|line3=Intercity|left3=Torrelavega|to-left3=Madrid Chamartín
|line4=Media Distancia|left4=Renedo|to-left4=Valladolid-Campo Grande|type4=20
|header5=Cercanías Santander
{{rail line |col=FF0000|route=C-1|previous=<small>toward  |next=}}
}}

FEVE

The metre-gauge Feve Services from Santander link it with Liérganes and Cabezón de la Sal as a commuter service, and regional services to Oviedo and Bilbao. The Transcantábrico'' tourist train also stops here.

References

Buildings and structures in Santander, Spain
Railway stations in Spain opened in 1858